(born ) is a Japanese singer and tarento.

He is best known as the first lead vocalist of Hiroshi Uchiyamada and Cool Five, which was formed in 1967 and debuted in 1969 with the Japan Record Award-winning song "Nagasaki wa Kyō mo Ame Datta". As a frontman of the band, he spawned multiple hit singles such as "Awazu ni Aishite", "Uwasa no Onna","Soshite, Kōbe", "Nakanoshima Blues" and "Tokyo Sabaku" during the 1970s. In 1982, he released his first solo single "Yuki Ressha" composed and produced by Grammy-winning musician Ryuichi Sakamoto, and left the group five years later. During his solo career, he released only one top-20 hit "Himawari" in 2002, a ballad contributed by Masaharu Fukuyama.　 

Aside from the recording career, Maekawa has also built up popularity as a TV star, appearing on some television shows hosted by comedians such as Kinichi Hagimoto and The Drifters, airing around the latter half of 1970s and the 1980s.

Personal life
He is also known as a former spouse of the singer, Keiko Fuji, who later married Teruzane Utada and had a daughter Hikaru.

Notable singles 

 ""(1987)
 ""  (1988)
 "" (1988)
 "" (1989, remake of Cool Five hit) – No. 87
 "" (1991) – No. 61
 "" (1992) – No. 71
 "" (1992) – No. 78
 "" (1994) – No. 95
 "" (1994) – No. 69
 "" (1996) – No. 96
 "" (1996) – No. 70
 "" (1997) – No. 97
 "" (1998) – No. 93
 "" (2000) – No. 93
 "" (2001) – No. 92
 "" (2001) – No. 88
 "" (2002) – No. 13
 "" (2003) – No. 74
 "" (2003) – No. 69
 "" (2006) – No. 62

Notes 
 Chart positions provided by the Oricon, and sources are from the archives on its official site (not available before 1988).

Kōhaku Uta Gassen Appearances

Filmography

Film
 Lupin III: Strange Psychokinetic Strategy (1974)
 Have a Song on Your Lips (2015)
 The Bucket List (2019)

Television
 Shinzanmono (2010)
 Mito Kōmon (2010)
 Maiagare! (2022)

References

External links 
  (in Japanese language)

1948 births
Enka singers
Japanese male singers
Japanese Roman Catholics
Japanese male television actors
Japanese racehorse owners and breeders
Living people
People from Sasebo
Musicians from Nagasaki Prefecture
Tokuma Japan Communications artists